The 2001 Atlantic hurricane season was a fairly active Atlantic hurricane season that produced 17 tropical cyclones, 15 named storms, nine hurricanes, and four major hurricanes. The season officially lasted from June 1, 2001, to November 30, 2001, dates which by convention limit the period of each year when tropical cyclones tend to form in the Atlantic Ocean basin. The season began with Tropical Storm Allison on June 4, and ended with Hurricane Olga, which dissipated on December 6. The most intense storm was Hurricane Michelle, which attained Category 4 strength on the Saffir–Simpson Hurricane Scale.

The most damaging storms of the season were Tropical Storm Allison, which caused extensive flooding in Texas, Hurricane Iris, which struck Belize, and Hurricane Michelle, which affected several countries. Three tropical cyclones made landfall on the United States, three directly affected Canada, and three directly affected Mexico and Central America. Overall, the season caused 153 fatalities, and $11.44 billion (2001 USD) in damage. Due to their severe damage, the names Allison, Iris, and Michelle were retired by the World Meteorological Organization.

Seasonal forecasts 

Forecasts of hurricane activity are issued before each hurricane season by noted hurricane experts William M. Gray. Philip J. Klotzbach, and their associates at Colorado State University; and separately by NOAA forecasters.

Gray's team defined the average number of storms per season (1950 to 2000) as 9.6 tropical storms, 5.9 hurricanes, 2.3 major hurricanes (storms reaching at least Category 3 strength in the Saffir-Simpson Hurricane Scale) and ACE Index 96.1. The National Oceanic and Atmospheric Administration (NOAA) defines a season as above-normal, near-normal or below-normal by a combination of the number of named storms, the number reaching hurricane strength, the number reaching major hurricane strength and ACE Index.

Pre-season forecasts 
On December 7, 2000, Gray's team issued its first extended-range forecast for the 2001 season, predicting above-average activity (13 named storms, 8 hurricanes, and about 4 of Category 3 or higher). It listed a 63 percent chance of at least one major hurricane striking the U.S. mainland. This included a 43 percent chance of at least one major hurricane strike on the East Coast, including the Florida peninsula, and a 36 percent chance of at least one such strike on the Gulf Coast from the Florida Panhandle westward. The potential for major hurricane activity in the Caribbean was forecast to near average.

On April 5, 2001, a new forecast was issued, calling for 12 named storms, 7 hurricanes, and 3 major hurricanes. The increase in the forecast was attributed to the warm sea surface temperatures, although the agency noted that the season would likely not be as active as previous ones due to the effect of a weak to moderate El Nino. The estimated potential for at least one major hurricane to affect the U.S. was upped slightly to 65 percent; the East Coast potential also went up slightly, and from the Florida Panhandle westward to Brownsville, Texas, the probability remained nearly the same.

Mid-season forecasts 
On August 7, 2001, Gray's team issued their first mid-season forecast for the 2001 season, keeping the forecast number at 12 named storms, with 7 becoming hurricanes and 3 becoming a major hurricane, noting that sea surface temperatures and sea level pressures continued to be favorable for above-average hurricane activity. The estimated potential for at least one major hurricane to affect the U.S. was upped slightly once again to 69 percent; the East Coast potential also went up slightly to 50%, and from the Florida Panhandle westward to Brownsville, Texas, the probability was also upped slightly.

On August 8, 2001, NOAA revised its season estimate slightly upwards to nine to twelve named storms, of which 6 to 8 were to be hurricanes, and 2 to 4 major hurricanes. The agency noted that sea surface temperatures continued to be favorable for above-average hurricane activity, and due to the likelihood that El Nino would not develop during the peak of the season, there was a reduced likelihood of a below-average year.

Season summary 

The Atlantic hurricane season officially began on June 1, 2001. It was an above-average season in which 17 tropical cyclones formed. Fifteen depressions attained tropical storm status, and nine of these reached hurricane status. Four hurricanes further intensified into major hurricanes. Favorable sea surface temperatures and sea-level pressures were the main factors in the season being above-average. The season would mark the end of a streak of four consecutive above-average seasons, beginning in 1998. This remained a record until six consecutive seasons featured above-average activity from 2016 to 2021. Four tropical cyclones during the season would degenerate in the deep tropics but later re-develop. Four other systems were classified as subtropical cyclones at some point in their duration, though each later became fully tropical systems. Overall, the Atlantic tropical cyclones of 2001 collectively resulted in 153 deaths and around $11.94 billion in damage. The season ended on November 30, 2001.

Tropical cyclogenesis began in June, with Tropical Storm Allison forming just offshore Texas on June 5. After Allison transitioned into an extratropical cyclone on June 17, no further activity occurred until Tropical Depression Two developed on July 11. However, the depression dissipated on the following day and there would be another break in activity, which ended on August 2, when Tropical Storm Barry formed in the Gulf of Mexico. The month of August featured two other systems, Chantal and Dean. Five tropical cyclones formed in September, four of which would become a hurricane, while the other remained a tropical depression. October featured an equal number of tropical systems, though all five featured at least tropical storm intensity. Two additional storms developed in November, Noel and Olga. Olga dissipated on December 4, ending seasonal activity.

The season's activity was reflected with an accumulated cyclone energy (ACE) rating of 110, above the 1950–2000 average of 96.1. ACE is, broadly speaking, a measure of the power of the hurricane multiplied by the length of time it existed, so storms that last a long time, as well as particularly strong hurricanes, have high ACEs. It is only calculated for full advisories on tropical systems at or exceeding , which is the threshold for tropical storm status.

Systems

Tropical Storm Allison 

The cyclone strengthened and peaked with winds of  six hours later. At 21:00 UTC on June 5, Allison made landfall near Freeport, Texas. It drifted northward through the state, turned to the south, and re-entered the Gulf of Mexico as a tropical depression on June 10. Allison then transitioned into a subtropical depression. The storm continued towards the east-northeast, made landfall on Louisiana early on June 11, and briefly became a subtropical storm despite being inland. Crossing the southeast United States and Mid-Atlantic, Allison emerged into the Atlantic at the Delmarva Peninsula on June 17. After temporarily re-attaining subtropical storm status, Allison interacted with a cold front offshore New England and became extratropical. Early on June 19, the remnant extratropical low dissipated near Nova Scotia.

Allison was the first storm since Tropical Storm Frances in 1998 to affect the northern Texas coastline. A major flood disaster occurred throughout its path from Texas to the Mid-Atlantic. In this area, flooding related to Allison destroyed or severely damaged more than 14,000 homes, while at least 51,430 others experienced some degree of damage. Floodwaters also entered over 95,000 vehicles and 1,700 businesses. The storm killed 41 people, including 27 who drowned. Overall, Allison caused about $8.5 billion in damage (2001 USD), making it the costliest and second-deadliest tropical storm on record in the United States.

Tropical Depression Two 

A tropical wave emerged into the Atlantic from the west coast of Africa on July 7. The remnant tropical wave reached the Lesser Antilles on July 13 and July 14.

Tropical Storm Barry 

On July 24, a tropical wave moved off the coast of Africa and tracked westward. The wave entered the Caribbean Sea on July 29 and gained in organization and convection, before reaching the Gulf of Mexico on August 1. Around 05:00 UTC on the next day, Barry made landfall near Santa Rosa Beach, Florida, at the same intensity. The storm weakened to a tropical depression over southern Alabama about seven hours later, before degenerating into a remnant low over Mississippi early on August 7. The remnant low continued north-northwestward until dissipating over Missouri on August 8.

Three people in Florida were killed by the storm, and total damage is estimated at $30 million (2001 USD).

Tropical Storm Chantal 

On August 11, a tropical wave emerged into the Atlantic from the west coast of Africa. The depression moved rapidly westward and degenerated into an open wave sometime on August 16 while still well east of the Windward Islands. With tropical storm-force winds, the system was reclassified as Tropical Storm Chantal. The cyclone strengthened to reach sustained winds of  twice in the Caribbean. Early on August 21, Chantal made landfall near the Belize–Mexico border at that intensity. The cyclone weakened to a tropical depression over Campeche on August 22, before dissipating over Tabasco several hours later.

The tropical wave associated with Chantal caused two deaths in Trinidad due to a lightning strike. In Belize, abnormally high tides along the coast damaged piers and seawalls. Winds and flooding due to heavy rainfall left damage to agricultural and infrastructural sectors. Overall, Belize suffered nearly $4 million in damage. Heavy rain fell in parts of Mexico, particularly in Quintana Roo, with up to  observed at Othón P. Blanco. This led to mudslides, leaving some areas isolated.

Tropical Storm Dean 

Between August 14 and August 15, a large tropical wave passed over Dakar, Senegal. The wave gradually acquired convection as it moved westward across the Atlantic. While crossing the Leeward Islands on August 22, a reconnaissance aircraft observed tropical storm-force winds and a surface circulation. Thus, Tropical Storm Dean developed at 12:00 UTC near Saint Croix. After crossing the Virgin Islands and entering the Atlantic, strong wind shear caused Dean to degenerate into an open tropical wave near the Bahamas on August 23. The remnants turned northward, and redeveloped on August 26 to the north of Bermuda. Located over warm waters and in an area of favorable conditions, Dean steadily strengthened while moving to the northeast and peaked just below hurricane status on August 28. The storm subsequently weakened over cooler waters, and became extratropical southeast of Newfoundland later that day. A frontal low absorbed the extratropical system on August 29.

The precursor wave associated with Dean dropped heavy rainfall in the Lesser Antilles, particularly in Puerto Rico. Floodwaters inundated many highways and entered 1,320 homes. Damage in Puerto Rico totaled about $7.7 million. In the U.S. Virgin Islands, winds downed some trees, caused power outages, and damaged a few roads. Later, Dean produced tropical storm-force wind gusts and light to moderate rainfall in Bermuda and Newfoundland.

Hurricane Erin 

However, two days later, wind shear caused Erin to degenerate into a remnant low-pressure area. The cyclone strengthened into a hurricane on September 9 while moving northwestward. The hurricane quickly intensified and reached peak winds of  later that day. Short-wave troughs turned Erin to the northeast by September 11. After passing just east of Cape Race, Newfoundland, Erin became extratropical on September 15. The extratropical remnant continued northeastward and lost its identity near Greenland on September 17.

Tropical cyclone warnings and watches were issued for Bermuda beginning on September 8, which were discontinued two days later after the storm bypassed the island. Wind gusts on Bermuda reached , felling several trees onto power lines. The storm produced large waves along the East Coast of the United States.

Hurricane Felix 

A tropical wave spawned a tropical depression on September 7 near the Cape Verde islands, which degenerated back into a tropical wave the next day due to strong shear. It redeveloped back into a tropical depression on September 10, and intensified into Tropical Storm Felix the next day while tracking generally northward. By that time, Felix had turned to the northeast, and subsequently entered an area of unfavorable conditions. The hurricane gradually weakened, deteriorating to a tropical storm on September 17. Cool waters and higher wind shear caused additional weakening while Felix nearly stalled to the southwest of the Azores. Late on September 18, the storm weakened to a tropical depression, and early the next day Felix dissipated.

Hurricane Gabrielle 

A weak low- to mid-level trough remained nearly stationary offshore the Southeastern United States in early September. A cut-off low developed over Florida on September 9, while an associated surface low formed by late on September 11. The depression drifted west-southwest and slowly intensified, before doubling-back to the east-northeast and strengthening into Tropical Storm Gabrielle on September 13. Gabrielle curved northeastward and reached sustained winds of  before making landfall near Venice, Florida, on the following day. After weakening slightly, Gabrielle emerged into the Atlantic near Titusville on September 15, accelerated to the northeast, and strengthened, becoming a Category 1 hurricane two days later. Colder water temperatures then weakened Gabrielle to a tropical storm on September 18, followed by an extratropical transition on September 19 well south of Newfoundland. The extratropical low was absorbed by a larger extratropical low over the far north Atlantic on September 21.

Hurricane Gabrielle produced moderate winds along coastal areas of western Florida, reaching  at Venice. The tide flooded the northern shoreline of Charlotte Harbor and at the entrance to the Peace River, while further to the south a surge of greater than  inundated the barrier island at Fort Myers Beach and flooded some cars. Hundreds of homes and buildings were damaged by the passage of Gabrielle, totaling several million Canadian dollars in damage.

Tropical Depression Nine 

A tropical depression formed from a tropical wave in the Caribbean on September 19, north-northwest of San Andres Island. After losing its closed circulation over land, it reformed into Hurricane Juliette in the East Pacific.

In El Salvador, heavy rains from the depression helped alleviate drought conditions; however, flooding also inundated 200 homes in San Salvador along the Acelhuate River. Fifteen farms were inundated by flooding, five of which were destroyed. Seventy people evacuated to shelters set up after the storm by the local Red Cross and armed forces. Military crews were quickly deployed to help clean up the damages on September 22.

Hurricane Humberto 

Hurricane Humberto formed from an area of low pressure generated by Hurricane Gabrielle. The low formed into a tropical depression on September 21 while south of Bermuda, tracking northwest, and was named Tropical Storm Humberto the next day. It began moving north, and then northeast as it passed Bermuda and strengthened into a hurricane. Humberto headed over the colder waters of the far north Atlantic Ocean, and dissipated quickly on September 27.

Hurricane Iris 

A tropical wave emerged into the Atlantic from the west coast of Africa in late September. It traveled across the Windward Islands, and intensified into Tropical Storm Iris while over the eastern Caribbean on October 5. Iris continued to the west and intensified. After passing just south of Jamaica, Iris reached Category 4 hurricane strength on October 8 to the north of Honduras. Iris rapidly weakened and dissipated over extreme southeastern Mexico several hours later. Although Iris's circulation dissipated, its remnants contributed to the development of Tropical Storm Manuel in the eastern Pacific Ocean on October 10.

Rainfall from the outerbands of Iris caused flooding in the Dominican Republic, resulting in the evacuation of 35 families after rivers exceeded their banks. Three people died when a landslide destroyed a home in Santo Domingo. Iris destroyed two homes and deroofed two others in Jamaica. The storm produced an  storm surge along the coast of Belize. A total of 3,718 homes were either damaged or destroyed, mostly in the Stann Creek and Toledo districts, rendering about 15,000 people homeless. Iris caused 24 deaths in Belize – with 20 occurring when the dive boat Wave Dancer capsized near Big Creek – and at least $250 million in damage. Flash floods and mudslides in Guatemala damaged 2,500 homes and 26 schools and killed 8 people. In Mexico, flooding due to heavy rains from Iris damaged 120 homes in Oaxaca and caused 2 deaths.

Tropical Storm Jerry 

Tropical Storm Jerry formed as a tropical depression from a tropical wave on October 6 near Barbados. The storm intensified into a tropical storm early the following day on October 7 while initially located under an environment of weak vertical wind shear. Deterioration in organization occurred, and Jerry dissipated while moving rapidly westward well south of Puerto Rico.

Hurricane Karen 

A cold front and an upper level trough interacted on October 10 to the south of Bermuda, and formed an extratropical storm. The storm passed near Bermuda on October 12, producing hurricane-force winds on the island. It then organized, becoming a subtropical cyclone on October 12 and a tropical cyclone on October 13. Karen strengthened to reach  winds as a Category 1 hurricane on the Saffir–Simpson Hurricane Scale, and after weakening over cooler waters, it made landfall on Nova Scotia as a tropical storm. It quickly became extratropical.

Later, in Newfoundland and Nova Scotia, the storm system that absorbed Hurricane Noel produced strong winds that downed several trees and power lines which resulted in power outages.

Tropical Storm Lorenzo 

An upper-level tropospheric trough persisted in the eastern Atlantic Ocean, developing a circulation by October 26 which quickly organized. Moving westward, the depression was forecast to attain winds of at least , although it failed to reach that intensity. Banding features developed over the storm, and on October 30 it was upgraded to Tropical Storm Lorenzo. By early on October 31, convection had begun to separate from the circulation, and later in the day Lorenzo became extratropical.

Hurricane Michelle 

A tropical wave emerged into the Atlantic from the west coast of Africa on October 16. The wave moved westward across the Atlantic and the Caribbean, before developing into a tropical depression along the east coast of Nicaragua on October 29. Convection increased after the depression entered the Caribbean, and the system intensified into Tropical Storm Michelle on November 1. It strengthened further, becoming a hurricane on November 2 and reaching Category 4 status on November 4, becoming one of only four tropical cyclones on record to reach that intensity in the month of November. Michelle was the strongest tropical cyclone to strike Cuba since Hurricane Fox in 1952. The storm rapidly weakened and fell to Category 1 intensity as it emerged into the Atlantic early on November 5. Michelle then moved quickly northeastward through the Bahamas and struck Andros and Eleuthera before transitioning into an extratropical cyclone. A frontal system absorbed the remnants of Michelle to the south of Bermuda by early on November 7.

The system that eventually became Michelle dropped torrential rains in several countries, causing at least six deaths in Honduras and four deaths in Nicaragua. An additional 26 people were reported missing in Central America. Flooding and mudslides damaged about 500 homes beyond repairs, while 561 others were impacted to some degree. The storm caused five deaths and $18 million in damage in Jamaica. Michelle went on to affect Cuba, where the storm produced  waves. The hurricane demolished 12,579 homes and damaged 166,515 others. Overall, Michelle caused five deaths and about $2 billion in damage in Cuba. Major damage also occurred in the Bahamas, totaling about $300 million.

Hurricane Noel 

A non-tropical frontal low developed from a cold front on November 1 to the west of the Azores. It intensified while moving west-northwestward and gradually dissipated its frontal structure. Operationally, the storm was considered a non-tropical low, and the National Hurricane Center did not begin issuing advisories until it became a tropical cyclone. It moved slowly northward as convection organized into a ring around the center. As a result of a ship reporting hurricane-force winds near the center, and due to the development of a weak mid-level warm core, the subtropical cyclone was reclassified as Hurricane Noel on November 5. Increasing westerly wind shear limited convection near the center, and Noel weakened to a tropical storm early on November 6. The extratropical remnant continued to the northeast and was absorbed by a larger extratropical storm later that day.

Hurricane Olga 

Hurricane Olga formed as a subtropical cyclone on November 24 and meandered westward where it reached hurricane status on November 26. The storm attained peak winds of  before turning southeastward and weakening back into a tropical storm. Olga dissipated as a tropical cyclone on December 6 east of the Bahamas.

Storm names 
The following names were used for named storms that formed in the north Atlantic in 2001. The names not retired from this list were used again in the 2007 season. This is the same list used for the 1995 season except for Lorenzo, Michelle, Olga, and Rebekah, which replaced Luis, Marilyn, Opal, and Roxanne. Storms were named Lorenzo, Michelle, and Olga for the first (and only, in the case of Michelle) time in 2001.

Retirement 

The World Meteorological Organization retired three names in the spring of 2002: Allison, Iris & Michelle. They were replaced in the 2007 season by Andrea, Ingrid, and Melissa. Allison became the first Atlantic tropical storm to have its name retired.

Season effects 
This is a table of all of the storms that formed in the 2001 Atlantic hurricane season. It includes their duration, names, intensities, areas affected, damages, and death totals. Deaths in parentheses are additional and indirect (an example of an indirect death would be a traffic accident), but were still related to that storm. Damage and deaths include totals while the storm was extratropical, a wave, or a low, and all of the damage figures are in 2001 USD.

See also 

 Atlantic hurricane season
 List of tropical cyclones
 2001 Pacific hurricane season
 2001 Pacific typhoon season
 2001 North Indian Ocean cyclone season
 South-West Indian Ocean cyclone seasons: 2000–01, 2001–02
 Australian region cyclone seasons: 2000–01, 2001–02
 South Pacific cyclone seasons: 2000–01, 2001–02

Notes

References

External links 

 National Hurricane Center Website
 National Hurricane Center's Atlantic Tropical Weather Outlook
 Tropical Cyclone Formation Probability Guidance Product
 Monthly Weather Review
 National Hurricane Center 2001 Atlantic hurricane season summary
 Rainfall impact from Tropical Cyclones in 2001

 
Articles which contain graphical timelines
Atlantic hurricane seasons
2001 Atl